Adriaan van Kervel ( 1681 – 19 September 1737) was governor of the Dutch Cape Colony from 31 August 1737 to 19 September 1737. After only three weeks of serving as Governor he died and Daniël van den Henghel was appointed in  an acting capacity.

Career 
Van Kervel arrived at the Cape on 3 February 1708, where he became an assistant in the secretariat of the Council of Policy. He was a member of the Council of Justice and in 1717 was appointed secretary to the Council of Policy. In 1725 he succeeded Cornelis van Beaumont as fiscal and was promoted to the rank of secunde (second in command or deputy governor). From 1726 to 1727, he was chairman of the orphan chamber and again from 1730 to 1737.

When Governor Jan de la Fontaine retired from office in 1737, the Lords XVII (Heren XVII) appointed Van Kervel as his successor. He took office on 31 August 1737 but died less than three weeks later, after a brief illness.

Personal
Van Kervel was the third child of Johannes van Kervel and his wife Anna Koene and baptized at The Hague on 23 July 1681. His eldest brother, Gerard, was Governor of the East Coast of Java. Van Kervel married Aletta Corsenaar on 14 June 1716 at the Cape and they had five children.

See also
 1730s in South Africa

References 

Governors of the Cape Colony
1737 deaths
1681 births
Governors of the Dutch Cape Colony